The fifth season of the reality television series Black Ink Crew: Chicago aired on VH1 from January 2, 2019 until August 6, 2019. It chronicles the daily operations and staff drama at an African American owned and operated tattoo shop 9MAG located in Chicago, Illinois.

Main cast

Ryan Henry
Charmaine Walker
Phor Brumfield
Don Brumfield
Van Johnson
Liliana Barrios

Recurring cast
Ashley P
JR Diaz
Jenn
Bella
Neekbey
Brittney Slam
Gina
Shine
Evenita
Adriana
Danielle Jamison
Cobra Kat

Episodes

References

Black Ink Crew
2019 American television seasons